Abdul Wahab Khan may refer to:
 Abdul Wahab Khan (politician), speaker of the National Assembly of Pakistan
 Abdul Wahab Khan (judge), Bangladeshi judge

See also
 Abdul Wahab Khan Tarzi, Afghan civil servant